Young Adult is a 2011 American comedy-drama film directed by Jason Reitman, written by Diablo Cody, and starring Charlize Theron. Reitman and Cody worked together previously on Juno (2007). Young Adult began a limited release on December 9, 2011, before expanding to a wide release on December 16, 2011. It received generally positive reviews from critics, and Theron earned a Golden Globe nomination for her performance.

Plot
Mavis Gary is a 37-year-old divorced, alcoholic ghost writer of a series of young adult novels, on deadline with her editor to finish the last book of the soon-to-be-canceled series. Mavis receives an e-mail with a picture of the newborn daughter of her high school boyfriend Buddy Slade and his wife Beth. Believing it to be a sign she and Buddy are meant to be together, Mavis leaves Minneapolis, returning to her hometown of Mercury, Minnesota, to reclaim her life with Buddy, under the pretext of overseeing a real estate deal.

Arriving after listening to "The Concept" by Teenage Fanclub from an old mixtape Buddy gave her in high school, Mavis arranges to meet him the next day at a local sports bar, for old times' sake. Beforehand, she goes alone to the bar, Woody's. There she reconnects with a former classmate she barely remembers, Matt Freehauf, who became disabled after being beaten by jocks who erroneously assumed he was gay. He tells her that her plan to reclaim Buddy is irrational and selfish, but she ignores him.

The following day, Mavis meets Buddy at the bar, where they see Matt again, as he is the bookkeeper. On their way out, Buddy invites Mavis to a performance of Beth's "mom rock band". Mavis spends another night getting drunk with Matt, who distills homemade bourbon in his garage where he lives with his sister Sandra. On another outing with him, Mavis also runs into a cousin who lives locally. When Mavis attends the gig, the other moms are resentful of Mavis, whom they remember as the "psychotic prom queen bitch". When Beth's band performs, the lead singer dedicates their opening song to Buddy from Beth; "The Concept". Angry, Mavis tries to get Buddy's attention on her, but she comes off as cringey.

Beth wants to stay out longer, so Mavis offers to drive the drunk Buddy home. On the lawn, they share a kiss that is quickly broken up when the babysitter opens the front door to greet them. The next day, after an awkward encounter with her parents, who didn't know Mavis was in town, Mavis is invited to Buddy's daughter's naming ceremony. She later brings Matt to their old high school to get drunk again, and he tells her to grow up. The following day, Mavis attends the party, where she declares her love for Buddy, but he rebuffs her. Everyone at the party is called out to the lawn to await a surprise Buddy has prepared for Beth. Mavis, who has been drinking, collides with Beth, who accidentally spills punch on Mavis's dress. Mavis insults her and, in a profanity-laced tirade, tearfully reveals that she became pregnant with Buddy's baby years ago but had a miscarriage at three months.

Buddy, who has been preparing a drum-set gift for Beth in the garage, opens the garage door and belatedly learns what has transpired. Mavis asks him why he invited her. He reveals it was Beth's idea, as she feels sorry for Mavis. Humiliated, Mavis leaves and visits Matt, where she breaks down in tears and, later, initiates sex. The following morning, while Matt sleeps, Mavis has coffee in the kitchen with Sandra, who still idolizes her. Mavis talks about needing to change herself, but Sandra says Mavis is better than the rest of Mercury and should not change. Mavis says she agrees and prepares to return to Minneapolis. Sandra asks to go with her but Mavis declines and leaves alone.

In a diner on her way home, Mavis writes the ending of the book, in which the main character graduates high school, quickly leaves her past behind, and looks forward to the future. Afterward, in the parking lot, she glances at the crumpled bumper of her car, before driving off.

Cast

Production
Screenwriter Diablo Cody said the genesis of the film came from her encounters with the press:

Writing a spec script, she sent drafts to her friend and Juno director, Jason Reitman, to critique. When the production of Labor Day, a film Reitman had been preparing, was pushed to 2012, a window developed during which he could direct Cody's script, which was shot on a $12 million budget in 30 days. The movie's location shooting was in Minnesota, while the bulk of the movie, set in the fictional town of Mercury, was shot north of New York City in the towns of White Plains, Nanuet, New City, Tappan, Ardsley, and Port Chester, and in the Long Island towns of Garden City and Massapequa Park, the last of which included Woody's Village Saloon. A few days were also shot on a soundstage at JC Studios in Brooklyn.

Following Charlize Theron and Patrick Wilson's casting, Patton Oswalt was signed after doing a table read-through of the script at Reitman's house. Oswalt said that because his character, Matt Freehauf, had been badly beaten as a teen and was required to walk with a brace, he consulted both an acting coach and a physical therapist to prepare for the role: "I just wanted less and less to have to think about so I could be more present in the scenes with Charlize. She's a really instinctual actor and I really didn't want to be sitting there with eight other thoughts in my head while she's just rolling with it."

Young Adult was screened out of competition at the 62nd Berlin International Film Festival.

Reception

Critical response
On review aggregator website Rotten Tomatoes, the film holds an approval rating of 80% based on 198 reviews, with an average rating of 7/10. The website's critical consensus reads, "Despite its somewhat dour approach, Young Adult is a funny and ultimately radical no-holds-barred examination of prolonged adolescence, thanks largely to a convincing performance by Charlize Theron." On Metacritic, the film has a weighted average score of 71 out of 100, based on 42 critics, indicating "generally favorable reviews".

Roger Ebert of the Chicago Sun-Times gave the film three-and-a-half stars out of four, writing, "After I left the screening of Young Adult, my thoughts were mixed. With Thank You for Smoking, Juno, and Up in the Air, Jason Reitman has an incredible track record. Those films were all so rewarding. The character of Mavis makes Young Adult tricky to process. As I absorbed it, I realized what a fearless character study it is. That sometimes it's funny doesn't hurt." Kyle Buchanan of Vulture called Mavis "a woman that dares the audience to dislike her", but 
Maureen Johnson of the Huffington Post stated that she is "mentally ill" and "suffers from depression, alcoholism, and trichotillomania (compulsive hair pulling)".

Tom Long of The Detroit News wrote, "Young Adult may be the year's most engaging feel-bad movie". A. O. Scott of The New York Times praised the film, writing, "Shorter than a bad blind date and as sour as a vinegar Popsicle, Young Adult shrouds its brilliant, brave and breathtakingly cynical heart in the superficial blandness of commercial comedy." Peter Travers of Rolling Stone gave the film three stars out of four, saying, "In this tale of stunted development, Theron is a comic force of nature, giving her character considerable density and humanity despite her monstrous aspects. And Patton Oswalt deserves cheers as Matt, a former classmate who pops Mavis's delusions with soul-crushing honesty. His dark duet with Theron is funny, touching and vital. But fair warning: The laughs in Young Adult leave bruises." Richard Roeper awarded the film an A grade, stating "Charlize Theron delivers one of the most impressive performances of the year".

The film appeared on many critics' lists of the best films of 2011.

Awards and nominations

References

External links
 
 
 

2011 films
2011 comedy-drama films
2010s English-language films
American comedy-drama films
American black comedy films
Films about alcoholism
Films about writers
Ghostwriting in fiction
Films about depression
Films about narcissism
Films directed by Jason Reitman
Films with screenplays by Diablo Cody
Films produced by Jason Reitman
Films produced by Mason Novick
Films scored by Rolfe Kent
Films set in Minnesota
Films shot in Minnesota
Films shot in New York (state)
Mandate Pictures films
Paramount Pictures films
2010s American films